Tess is a 1979 drama film directed by Roman Polanski and starring Nastassja Kinski, Peter Firth, and Leigh Lawson. It is an adaptation of Thomas Hardy's 1891 novel Tess of the d'Urbervilles. The screenplay was written by Gérard Brach, John Brownjohn, and Roman Polanski. The film received positive critical reviews upon release and was nominated for six Academy Awards, including Best Picture, winning three for Best Cinematography, Best Art Direction and Best Costume Design.

Plot 
The story takes place in Thomas Hardy's Wessex during the 1880s.

The events of the story are set in motion when a clergyman, Parson Tringham, has a chance conversation with John Durbeyfield, a simple farmer. Tringham is a local historian, and in the course of his research he has discovered the "Durbeyfields" are descended from the d'Urbervilles, a noble family whose lineage extends to the time of William the Conqueror. The family lost its land and prestige when the male heirs died out. The parson thinks Durbeyfield might like to know his origins as a passing historical curiosity.

Durbeyfield soon becomes fixated upon the idea of using his noble lineage to better his family's fortunes. Finding a wealthy family named d'Urberville living nearby, he and his wife send their daughter Tess to call on his presumed relations, and seek employment at the manor house. At the manor house live Alec d'Urberville and his mother. Tess is a beautiful girl, and Alec d'Urberville has an appetite for women. Alec and his mother know they are no relation to Tess, for their family name and coat of arms had been purchased. Finding her naive, penniless and attractive, he sets about taking advantage of the situation. He tries to get her alone, and attempts to seduce her with strawberries and roses, but these efforts are parried by Tess. In time, he rapes her. 

For a time they grow closer, but after four months at the manor Tess returns home, and soon discovers she is pregnant. She is angry with her mother for placing her at risk when she knows so little of the world's cruelty. The baby is born sickly and dies. Sometime later, Tess goes to a dairy farm to work as a milkmaid. She meets Angel Clare, an aspiring young farmer from a respectable family. He believes Tess to be an unspoiled country girl, and completely innocent. The two fall in love, but Tess does not reveal her previous relationship with Alec until their wedding night. Disillusioned and heartbroken by the news, Angel rejects her.

Deserted by her husband, Tess meets Alec d'Urberville again. She at first angrily rebuffs his advances, but the death of her father puts the family in desperately hard times. Facing starvation, eviction and homelessness, Tess submits to Alec to support her mother and siblings.

Shortly afterwards, Angel Clare returns from travelling abroad. A disastrous missionary tour in Brazil has ruined his health. Humbled, and having had plenty of time to think, he feels remorse for his treatment of Tess. He succeeds in tracking her down but leaves heartbroken when he finds her living with Alec. Tess realizes that going back to Alec has ruined her chances of happiness with Angel, and she murders Alec.

Running away to find Angel, Tess is reconciled with him; he can finally accept and embrace her as his wife without passing moral judgment on her actions. They consummate their marriage, spending two nights of happiness together on the run from the law before Tess is captured sleeping at Stonehenge. An ending summary tells that she is convicted and hanged for murder.

Cast 

 Nastassja Kinski as Tess Durbeyfield (listed as "Nastassia Kinski")
 Peter Firth as Angel Clare
 Leigh Lawson as Alec Stokes-d'Urberville
 John Collin as John Durbeyfield
 Rosemary Martin as Mrs. Durbeyfield
 Carolyn Pickles as Marian
 Richard Pearson as Vicar of Marlott
 David Markham as Reverend Clare
 Pascale de Boysson as Mrs. Clare
 Suzanna Hamilton as Izz Huett
 Caroline Embling as Retty
 Tony Church as Parson Tringham
 Sylvia Coleridge as Mrs. d'Urberville
 Fred Bryant as Dairyman Crick
 Tom Chadbon as Cuthbert Clare
 Arielle Dombasle as Mercy Chant
 Dicken Ashworth as Farmer Groby
 Lesley Dunlop as Girl in henhouse

Production 
Polanski was inspired to make the film by his wife Sharon Tate, who gave him a copy of Tess of the d'Urbervilles. She said it would make a great film and expressed interest in playing the part of Tess. It was the last time Polanski saw her alive, as she was departing back for America while he stayed on a while longer in Europe to finish working on a film. She was murdered by the Manson Family on 9 August 1969 while he was away. The film is dedicated to her ("To Sharon") at the beginning.

Polanski wrote the screenplay in French with his usual collaborator Gérard Brach, then it was translated and expanded by John Brownjohn. The story line largely follows that of the book, although the role of Alec d'Urberville is toned down.

Costumes for the film were designed by Anthony Powell. He received his third Academy Award for this work.

Set in Dorset, England, the film was shot at various locations in France: Normandy (Cotentin, la Hague, Omonville-la-Rogue, Éculleville, Sainte-Croix-Hague, le Vast, Bricquebec, Saint-Jacques-de-Néhou), Brittany (Locronan, le Leslay) and Nord-Pas-de-Calais (Condette). Polanski was living in Europe as he was wanted as a fugitive after his conviction for sex with an underage girl in the United States. He had fled before sentencing and could have been extradited to the U.S. from the United Kingdom.

Polanski intended the film to reflect an ancient peasant culture, which he had seen in Poland during World War II after fleeing the Kraków ghetto. The scenes also refer to the genre painting of the French artists Georges de La Tour of the 17th century and Gustave Courbet of the 19th century.

During the third month of shooting, on 28 October 1978, the cinematographer Geoffrey Unsworth died of a heart attack. Most of the scenes he had shot were exteriors that occur in the first half of the film. Ghislain Cloquet shot the remainder of the film, including most of the interior scenes. Both Unsworth and Cloquet were nominated and won an Academy Award for Best Cinematography. Cloquet alone was nominated for the César Award for Cinematography, which he won.

Music 
The original musical score was composed by Philippe Sarde and orchestrated by Peter Knight. It was performed by the London Symphony Orchestra. The melody played by the character Clare on a recorder is a popular Polish folk song "Laura i Filon".

Release 
Tess was released in theaters in the United States on 12 December 1980. During its entire theatrical run, the film grossed little over $20 million in the United States ($60 million in 2014 dollars), which made it the 33rd highest-grossing film of 1980.

Alternate versions 
The film premiered in France in 1979 at a length of 186 minutes. Polanski writes in his autobiography that he felt that the cut was incomplete, rushed to meet the release date. The film premiered in 1980 in the U.S. at a re-edited length of 170 minutes. Later, overseas releases of the film in theaters and on home video ran as little as 136 minutes. The 170-minute cut is Polanski's approved version of the film. This version recently was restored in 4K from the original negative under Polanski's supervision, and he attended its premiere at the 2012 Cannes Film Festival.

Reception

Critical response
On Rotten Tomatoes, the film has an approval rating of 81% based on reviews from 77 critics, with an average rating of 7.3/10 with the consensus: "A reverent adaptation of Thomas Hardy's novel, Tess marries painterly cinematography and unhurried pacing to create an epic ode to perseverance." On Metacritic, the film has a score of 82% based on reviews from 15 critics, indicating "universal acclaim".

In a review in The New York Times, Janet Maslin described Tess as "a lovely, lyrical, unexpectedly delicate movie". 

Roger Ebert of the Chicago Sun-Times gave the film four out of four stars and wrote: "This is a wonderful film; the kind of exploration of doomed young sexuality that, like Elvira Madigan, makes us agree that the lovers should never grow old."
The film is one of Polanski's rare love stories, and is one of his most highly acclaimed works.

Accolades
Tess was nominated for six awards, including Best Picture, at the 53rd Academy Awards and won three. It was also nominated for four Golden Globe Awards (winning two), three British Academy Film Awards (winning one) and six César Awards (winning three).

References

External links 
 
 
 
 
 The Truest Tess an essay by Colin MacCabe at the Criterion Collection

1979 films
1970s English-language films
1979 romantic drama films
1970s historical drama films
Best Film César Award winners
British romantic drama films
British epic films
British historical drama films
Films based on romance novels
Films based on Tess of the d'Urbervilles
Films directed by Roman Polanski
Films set in England
Films set in the 19th century
Films whose art director won the Best Art Direction Academy Award
Films whose cinematographer won the Best Cinematography Academy Award
Films whose director won the Best Director César Award
Films about capital punishment
French epic films
Romantic epic films
Romantic period films
Films set in the Victorian era
Films that won the Best Costume Design Academy Award
Films shot in France
Films produced by Claude Berri
Films with screenplays by Gérard Brach
Films with screenplays by Roman Polanski
Films scored by Philippe Sarde
Best Foreign Language Film Golden Globe winners
English-language French films
1979 drama films
1970s British films
1970s French films